The 2008 CONCACAF Women's Olympic Qualifying Tournament qualification determined the two teams from the Caribbean and one team from Central America that joined Canada, Mexico and the United States at the 2008 CONCACAF Women's Olympic Qualifying Tournament in Mexico.

Caribbean Zone
The Caribbean Zone qualifying was held in two rounds from October to December 2007.

First round
Four groups will played in the first round (three groups of four and one group of three), with the group winners moving on to a second round.

Group 1

Group 2

Group 3

Group 4

Second round
The four remaining teams were drawn into two pairings. The winners of each tie progressed to the Olympic qualifying final tournament. Puerto Rico hosted both legs of their tie against Trinidad and Tobago in Bayamón, while Cuba hosted both legs of their tie against Jamaica in Havana. However, the away goals rule was still applied, with the visitors (Trinidad and Tobago and Jamaica) counted as the "home" teams for the second legs.

Summary

Matches

2–2 on aggregate. Trinidad and Tobago won on away goals and qualified for the CONCACAF Women's Olympic Qualifying Tournament.

Jamaica won 3–0 on aggregate and qualified for the CONCACAF Women's Olympic Qualifying Tournament.

Central American Zone

Bracket

First round
Two home and away series were scheduled to be played in the first round, with the winners advancing to the second round. Panama withdrew from their scheduled match against Costa Rica, so Costa Rica advanced on a walkover to the second round.

Summary

Matches

Nicaragua won 5–1 on aggregate and advanced to the second round.

Panama withdrew. Costa Rica won on walkover and advanced to the second round.

Second round

Summary

Matches

Costa Rica won 9–0 on aggregate and qualified for the CONCACAF Women's Olympic Qualifying Tournament.

Goalscorers

References

External links
 2008 CONCACAF Women Pre-Olympic Tournament

Qual
2007 in women's association football